Knox is a former town in Vinton County, in the U.S. state of Ohio. The GNIS classifies it as a populated place.

History
A post office called Knox was established in 1899, and remained in operation until 1904. The community derived its name from Henry Knox, first U.S. Secretary of War.

References

Unincorporated communities in Vinton County, Ohio
Unincorporated communities in Ohio